Loraine Seville (born July 25, 1986), better known by her stage names Raine Seville, is a Jamaican dancehall and reggae artist.

She was born and raised In Kingston, Jamaica.

She started singing while she was still young and in 2004 she joined the first Digicel Rising Stars in Mandeville to pursue music and she only made it to the top 100, at the same time she was a part-time student at the Edna Manley College of the Visual and Performing Arts until the year 2006

From 2006 to 2007, she continued voice classes with the distinguished voice trainer Georgia Schlifer.

References

External links 
 = Raine Seville Biography. Jamadio.com
 = Raine Seville dancehall and regggae music artiste. Dancehall Reggae World

Jamaican reggae singers
1986 births
Living people